Bovell is a semi-rural suburb of the Western Australian city of Busselton. At the 2021 census, it had a population of 475. The area has been earmarked for future urban development. Bovell contains Geographe Primary School, named after the nearby suburb, which was established in 2002.
 
The farmhouses Cattle Chosen and Fairlawn were built by the early European settlers John Bussell and John Molloy, respectively, in what is now the suburb of Bovell.

References

Suburbs of Busselton